Bolothrips is a genus of thrips in the family Phlaeothripidae.

Species
 Bolothrips africanus
 Bolothrips bicolor
 Bolothrips cinctus
 Bolothrips cingulatus
 Bolothrips dentipes
 Bolothrips dentis
 Bolothrips embotyi
 Bolothrips gilvipes
 Bolothrips icarus
 Bolothrips inaccessiblensis
 Bolothrips insularis
 Bolothrips italicus
 Bolothrips moundi
 Bolothrips pratensis
 Bolothrips rachiphilus
 Bolothrips schaferi
 Bolothrips varius

References

Phlaeothripidae
Thrips
Thrips genera